The Ministry of Sport, Youth and National Service (MSYNS) is a department of the Namibian government. It was established as Ministry of Youth and Sport in 1991 when sport was split-off from the Ministry of Education. The first minister of education, culture and sport was Nahas Angula, serving from independence in 1990. The first minister of youth and sport was Pendukeni Iivula-Ithana. The  minister is Agnes Tjongarero.

The ministry was dissolved in 2000; The youth portfolio was discontinued, and sports was added to the Ministry of Basic Education. In 2005 it was reestablished as Ministry of Youth, National Service, Sport and Culture. Culture was again given back to the Ministry of Education in 2015, and the youth and sport ministry got its current name.

MSYNS appoints, directs, and takes advice from, the Namibia Sports Commission.

Ministers
All youth and sport ministers in chronological order are:

References

External links
Official website Ministry of Sport, Youth and National Service

Sport in Namibia
Namibian culture
1991 establishments in Namibia
2000 disestablishments in Namibia
2005 establishments in Namibia